Kranen is a surname. Notable people with the surname include:

 Henrique Kranen (1911–1974), Brazilian rower
 Kathryn Kranen, American electronic design automation engineer and business executive